The 2009 Florida Gators baseball team represented the University of Florida in the sport of baseball during the 2009 college baseball season. The Gators competed in Division I of the National Collegiate Athletic Association (NCAA) and the Eastern Division of the Southeastern Conference (SEC). They played their home games at Alfred A. McKethan Stadium, on the university's Gainesville, Florida campus. The team was coached by Kevin O'Sullivan, who was in his second season at Florida.

Roster

Schedule 

! style="background:#FF4A00;color:white;"| Regular season
|- valign="top" 

|- align="center" bgcolor="ddffdd"
| February 20 || No. 8  ||No. 25
| McKethan Stadium ||6–3||Keating (1–0)
|Marks (0–1)
|Bullock (1)
|4,403
| 1–0 || –
|- align="center" bgcolor="ddffdd"
| February 21 || No. 8 Louisville ||No. 25
| McKethan Stadium ||10–4||Panteliodis (1–0)
|Kiekhefer (0–1)
|None
|3,483
| 2–0 || –
|- align="center" bgcolor="ddffdd"
| February 22 || No. 8 Louisville ||No. 25
| McKethan Stadium ||3–2||Barfield (1–0)
|Royse (0–1)
|None
|3,094
| 3–0 || –
|- align="center" bgcolor="ddffdd"
| February 24 ||  ||No. 12
|McKethan Stadium
|12–0||Poovey (1–0)
|Glover (0–1)
|None
|2,163
| 4–0 || –
|- align="center" bgcolor="ddffdd"
| February 25 || Eastern Michigan ||No. 12
| McKethan Stadium ||17–6||Chapman (1–0)
|Combs (0–2)
|None
|2,143
| 5–0 || –
|- align="center" bgcolor="ffdddd"
| February 27 || No. 14 Rivalry||No. 12
| McKethan Stadium ||5–8||Hernandez (2–0)
|Keating (1–1)
|Bellamy (2)
|4,714
| 5–1 || –
|- align="center" bgcolor="ffdddd"
| February 28 || No. 14 Miami (FL)Rivalry||No. 12
| McKethan Stadium ||1–2||Gutierrez (1–0)
|Panteliodis (1–1)
|Bellamy (3)
|4,570
| 5–2 || –
|-

|- align="center" bgcolor="ffdddd"
| March 1 || No. 14 Miami (FL)Rivalry||No. 12|| McKethan Stadium ||2–16||Nazario (2–0)||Maronde (0–1)||None||3,038||5–3||–
|- align="center" bgcolor="ddffdd"
| March 3 || at  ||No. 20||Melching FieldDeLand, FL
| 5–2 ||Barfield (2–0)||Mauldin (0–1)||Bullock (2)||1,928||6–3||–
|- align="center" bgcolor="ffdddd"
| March 4 ||||No. 20|| McKethan Stadium || 6–7 ||Schmitt (3–0)||Keating (1–2)||Adams (3)||2,340||6–4||–
|- align="center" bgcolor="ddffdd"
| March 6 ||Duquesne||No. 20|| McKethan Stadium || 10–5 ||Panteliodis (2–1)||Pierpont (0–3)||None||2,351||7–4
|–
|- align="center" bgcolor="ddffdd"
| March 7 ||Duquesne||No. 20|| McKethan Stadium || 5–3 ||Maronde (1–1)||Juran (0–3)||Barfield (1)||2,487||8–4
|–
|- align="center" bgcolor="ddffdd"
| March 8 ||Duquesne||No. 20|| McKethan Stadium || 12–2 ||Keating (2–2)||Elms (0–1)||None||2,493||9–4
|–
|- align="center" bgcolor="ffdddd"
| March 13 ||at Arkansas||No. 19||Baum StadiumFayetteville, AR
| 4–11 ||Keuchel (2–0)||Bullock (0–1)||None||6,511||9–5
|0–1
|- align="center" bgcolor="ffdddd"
| March 14 ||at Arkansas||No. 19||Baum Stadium
| 4–8 ||Forrest (1–1)||Panteliodis (2–2)||None||6,840||9–6
|0–2
|- align="center" bgcolor="ffdddd"
| March 15 ||at Arkansas||No. 19||Baum Stadium
| 2–4 ||Cox (2–0)||Keating (2–3)||Richards (2)||7,411||9–7
|0–3
|- align="center" bgcolor="ddffdd"
| March 17 ||Rivalry|||| McKethan Stadium || 5–4 ||Davis (1–0)||Marshall (1–1)||None||3,369||10–7
|–
|- align="center" bgcolor="ddffdd"
| March 18 ||at ||||Jay Bergman FieldOrlando, FL
| 7–3 ||DeSclafani (1–0)||Brown (0–3)||None||2,758||11–7
|–
|- align="center" bgcolor="ddffdd"
| March 20 |||||| McKethan Stadium || 3–2 ||Davis (2–0)||Hernandez (1–2)||Bullock (3)||2,773||12–7
|1–3
|- align="center" bgcolor="ddffdd"
| March 21 ||Tennessee|||| McKethan Stadium || 10–2 ||Franklin (1–0)||McCray (3–1)||None||2,929||13–7
|2–3
|- align="center" bgcolor="ddffdd"
| March 22 ||Tennessee|||| McKethan Stadium || 7–5 ||Larson (1–0)||Tullo (1–2)||None||2,859||14–7
|3–3
|- align="center" bgcolor="ffdddd"
| March 24 ||at ||No. 23||Harmon StadiumJacksonville, FL
| 0–3 ||Jones (1–0)||Larson (1–1)||None||3,194||14–8||–
|- align="center" bgcolor="ddffdd"
| March 25 ||North Florida||No. 23||McKethan Stadium
| 5–3 ||Poovey (2–0)||Collier (0–2)||Bullock (4)||2,363||15–8
|–
|- align="center" bgcolor="ddffdd"
| March 27 ||||No. 23||McKethan Stadium|| 11–4 ||Franklin (2–0)||Hyatt (4–1)||Bullock (5)||2,357||16–8
|4–3
|- align="center" bgcolor="ddffdd"
| March 28 ||Alabama||No. 23||McKethan Stadium|| 9–8 ||Larson (2–1)||Nelson (1–3)||None||3,173||17–8
|5–3
|- align="center" bgcolor="ddffdd"
| March 29 ||Alabama||No. 23|| McKethan Stadium || 10–7 ||DeSclafani (2–0)||Howell (2–1)||Bullock (6)||2,803||18–8
|6–3
|- align="center" bgcolor="ffdddd"
| March 31 || vs. Florida StateRivalry ||No. 19|| Baseball GroundsJacksonville, FL || 2–35 ||Gast (3–2)||Panteliodis (2–3)||Gilmartin (1)||6,251||18–9||–
|-

|- align="center" bgcolor="ddffdd"
| April 3 ||at ||No. 19||Hawkins FieldNashville, TN
|8–4||Davis (3–0)||Minor (2–3)||None||2,672||19–9||7–3
|- align="center" bgcolor="ffdddd"
| April 4 ||at Vanderbilt||No. 19||Hawkins Field||3–4||Cotham (4–3)||DeSclafani (2–1)||Gray (4)||3,700||19–10||7–4
|- align="center" bgcolor="ffdddd"
| April 5 ||at Vanderbilt||No. 19||Hawkins Field||9–16||Gray (2–0)||Bullock (0–2)||None||2,256||19–11||7–5
|- align="center" bgcolor="ddffdd"
| April 7 ||||No. 22|| McKethan Stadium ||12–7||Davis (4–0)||Rodriguez (0–1)||None||2,247||20–11||–
|- align="center" bgcolor="ddffdd"
| April 8 ||UCF||No. 22||McKethan Stadium
|16–3||DeSclafani (3–1)||Weech (3–1)||None||2,630||21–11||–
|- align="center" bgcolor="ffdddd"
| April 10 ||at ||No. 22||Plainsman ParkAuburn, AL
|7–811
|Hendrix (6–2)||Panteliodis (2–4)||None||2,082||21–12||7–6
|- align="center" bgcolor="ddffdd"
| April 11 ||at Auburn||No. 22||Plainsman Park||24–2||Locke (1–0)||Jacobs (3–2)||None||2,531||22–12
|8–6
|- align="center" bgcolor="ddffdd"
| April 12 ||at Auburn||No. 22||Plainsman Park
|5–1||DeSclafani (4–1)||Thompson (2–2)||Panteliodis (1)||1,850||23–12
|9–6
|- align="center" bgcolor="ddffdd"
| April 14 ||at No. 22 Florida StateRivalry||No. 20||Dick Howser StadiumTallahassee, FL
|10–2||Larson (3–1)||O'Dell (3–2)||None||6,345||24–12
|–
|- align="center" bgcolor="ddffdd"
| April 15 ||Stetson||No. 20||McKethan Stadium||15–4||Panteliodis (3–4)||Burns (2–4)||None||2,390||25–12
|–
|- align="center" bgcolor="ffdddd"
| April 17 ||No. 19 ||No. 20||McKethan Stadium
|2–6||Pomeranz (4–1)||Barfield (2–1)||None||3,563||25–13||9–7
|- align="center" bgcolor="ddffdd"
| April 18 ||No. 19 Ole Miss||No. 20||McKethan Stadium||8–4||Locke (2–0)||Irwin (5–3)||None||5,103||26–13||10–7
|- align="center" bgcolor="ffdddd"
| April 19 ||No. 19 Ole Miss||No. 20|| McKethan Stadium ||3–58
|Bittle (4–2)||Panteliodis (3–5)||Morgan (5)||2,839||26–14||10–8
|- align="center" bgcolor="ddffdd"
| April 21 ||vs. ||No. 22||Hammond StadiumFort Myers, FL
|12–3||Bullock (1–2)||Crumbly (3–3)||None||5,147
|27–14
|–
|- align="center" bgcolor="ddffdd"
| April 22 ||||No. 22|| McKethan Stadium ||5–410
|Maronde (2–1)||Cole (1–2)||None||2,450||28–14
|–
|- align="center" bgcolor="ddffdd"
| April 24 ||||No. 22|| McKethan Stadium ||9–4||Locke (3–0)||Dyson (6–3)||None||2,473||29–14
|11–8
|- align="center" bgcolor="ddffdd"
| April 25 ||South Carolina||No. 22|| McKethan Stadium ||8–3||Davis (5–0)||Belcher (2–3)||Bullock (7)||2,784||30–14
|12–8
|- align="center" bgcolor="ddffdd"
| April 26 ||South Carolina||No. 22|| McKethan Stadium ||9–5||Panteliodis (4–5)||Cooper (5–4)||Bullock (8)||2,743||31–14
|13–8
|-

|- align="center" bgcolor="ddffdd"
| May 1 ||at No. 6 ||No. 17||Foley FieldAthens, GA
|10-911
|Bullock (2–2)||Weaver (1–2)||None||3,579||32–14
|14–8
|- align="center" bgcolor="ddffdd"
| May 2 ||at No. 6 Georgia||No. 17||Foley Field||7–6||DeSclafani (5–1)||McRee (4–1)||Bullock (9)||3,373||33–14
|15–8
|- align="center" bgcolor="ddffdd"
| May 3 ||at No. 6 Georgia||No. 17||Foley Field||10–8||Keating (3–3)||Tanner (3–1)||Bullock (10)||3,173||34–14
|16–8
|- align="center" bgcolor="ffdddd"
| May 6 ||Florida Gulf Coast||No. 9||McKethan Stadium||5–17||Barnes (1–1)||Poovey (2–1)||None||2,650||34–15
|–
|- align="center" bgcolor="ffdddd"
| May 8 ||at No. 3 LSU||No. 9||Alex Box StadiumBaton Rouge, LA
|1–10||Ranaudo (6–3)||Locke (3–1)||None||10,203||34–16
|16–9
|- align="center" bgcolor="ffdddd"
| May 9 ||at No. 3 LSU||No. 9||Alex Box Stadium||0–4||Coleman (10–2)||DeSclafani (5–2)||None||10,923||34–17
|16–10
|- align="center" bgcolor="ddffdd"
| May 10 ||at No. 3 LSU||No. 9||Alex Box Stadium||9–3||Maronde (3–1)||Ross (5–6)||None||9,578||35–17
|17–10
|- align="center" bgcolor="ddffdd"
| May 12 ||||#11|| McKethan Stadium ||7–4||Panteliodis (5–5)||Dunlap (1–1)||Bullock (11)||2,294||36–17
|–
|- align="center" bgcolor="ddffdd"
| May 14 ||Kentucky||No. 11|| McKethan Stadium ||10–3||Locke (4–1)||Paxton (5–3)||None||2,312||37–17
|18–10
|- align="center" bgcolor="ffdddd"
| May 15 ||Kentucky||No. 11|| McKethan Stadium ||7–8||Rusin (7–4)||DeSclafani (5–3)||Darnell (3)||3,121||37–18
|18–11
|- align="center" bgcolor="ddffdd"
| May 16 ||Kentucky||No. 11||McKethan Stadium
|13–9||Panteliodis (6–5)||Darnell (5–6)||None||2,965||38–18
|19–11
|-

|-
! style="background:#FF4A00;color:white;"| Post-season
|-

|- align="center" bgcolor="ffdddd"
| May 20 || vs. Arkansas ||No. 9|| Regions ParkHoover, AL || 5–8 ||Bolsinger (4–4)||Locke (4–2)||Richards (9)||5,121||38–19||0–1
|- align="center" bgcolor="ddffdd"
| May 21 || vs. No. 8 Ole Miss ||No. 9|| Regions Park || 12–28 ||DeSclafani (6–3)||Bukvich (9–3)||None||6,524||39–19||1–1
|- align="center" bgcolor="ffdddd"
| May 22 || vs. Arkansas ||No. 9|| Regions Park || 7–10 ||Murphy (3–1)||Larson (3–2)||Cox (1)||7,243||39–20||1–2
|-

|- align="center" bgcolor="ddffdd"
| May 29 ||Bethune–Cookman||No. 10|| McKethan Stadium || 8–7 ||Bullock (3–2)||Thomas (7–6)||None||2,440||40–20||1–0
|- align="center" bgcolor="ddffdd"
|May 30||No. 18 Miami (FL)Rivalry||No. 10|| McKethan Stadium || 8–2 ||Locke (5–2)||Hernandez (7–5)||None||4,109||41–20||2–0
|- align="center" bgcolor="ddffdd"
|May 31||No. 18 Miami (FL)Rivalry||No. 10|| McKethan Stadium || 16–5 ||Keating (4–3)||Nazario (6–5)||None||2,351||42–20||3–0
|-

|- align="center" bgcolor="ffdddd"
| June 6 ||No. 17 ||No. 9|| McKethan Stadium ||7–9||Johnston (1–0)||Keating (4–4)||Cargill (12)||3,570||42–21|| 0–1
|- align="center" bgcolor="ffdddd"
| June 7 ||No. 17 Southern Miss||No. 9|| McKethan Stadium ||6–7||Copeland (2–5)||Bullock (3–3)||Cargill (13)||4,313||42–22|| 0–2
|-

Rankings from Collegiate Baseball. All times Eastern. Retrieved from FloridaGators.com

See also 
 Florida Gators
 List of Florida Gators baseball players

References

External links 
 Gator Baseball official website

Florida Gators baseball seasons
Florida Gators baseball team
Florida Gators